The Atkins Commercial Historic District encompasses the historic business district of Atkins, Arkansas.  It extends for two blocks on Main Street and 1st Street, between Church and 2nd Avenues.  This area was largely developed between 1890 and 1959 as a trade and manufacturing center for the surrounding area, with most of its architecture dating before 1921.  Most of the buildings are brick single-story buildings with vernacular commercial designs.

The district was listed on the National Register of Historic Places in 2009.

See also
National Register of Historic Places listings in Pope County, Arkansas

References

External links

Historic districts on the National Register of Historic Places in Arkansas
Commercial buildings completed in 1890
National Register of Historic Places in Pope County, Arkansas
1890 establishments in Arkansas
Buildings designated early commercial in the National Register of Historic Places in Arkansas